Kevin Michael Miller (born December 21, 1977) is an American voice actor, comedian, and podcast host.

Biography
Miller is well known as the voice of Sly Cooper, the main character from the video game series of the same name. He has worked for Sega, Namco, The Learning Company, Sony, Paramount and others. He also performs in live action as an improvisor within the comedy groups ComedySportz and Unscriptables and is the co-host of the Second Funniest Podcast.

Filmography

References

External links

Living people
American male comedians
American male video game actors
American male voice actors
21st-century American male actors
21st-century American comedians
San Jose State University alumni
Place of birth missing (living people)
1977 births